Hungary was represented by Friderika Bayer, with the song "Kinek mondjam el vétkeimet?", at the 1994 Eurovision Song Contest, which took place on 30 April in Dublin. "Kinek mondjam el vétkeimet?" was chosen as the Hungarian entry at a national final called Táncdalfesztiválja on 5 February. This was Hungary's first appearance in a Eurovision final after their debut entry failed to progress from the pre-qualifier Kvalifikacija za Millstreet in 1993.

Before Eurovision

Táncdalfesztivál 1994 
Táncdalfesztivál 1994 was the national final organised by broadcaster Magyar Televízió (MTV) and held at their studios in Budapest, hosted by Dorottya Geszler. 15 songs took part with the winner being chosen by a 16-member jury who each awarded between 1 and 9 points per song. Votes were given out generously as "Kinek mondjam el vétkeimet?" received only 4 points short of the maximum total possible, and even the last placed song had an average score of 6.1.

At Eurovision 
On the night of the final Bayer performed 22nd in the running order, following Spain and preceding Russia. "Kinek mondjam el vétkeimet?" got off to the a strong start in the voting, receiving maximum 12s from the first three juries (Sweden, Finland and Ireland). However the votes received then became more mixed, with only one further 12 (from Poland) and six juries bypassing the song altogether. At the close of voting "Kinek mondjam el vétkeimet?" had received 122 points, placing Hungary 4th of the 25 entries, which remains the country's best Eurovision placement to date.

Voting

References 

1994
Countries in the Eurovision Song Contest 1994
Eurovision